

This is a list of National Register of Historic Places listings in New Haven, Connecticut.

This is intended to be a complete list of the properties and districts on the National Register of Historic Places in the city of New Haven, Connecticut, United States. The locations of National Register properties and districts for which the latitude and longitude coordinates are included below, may be seen in an online map.

There are 270 properties and districts listed on the National Register in New Haven County. The city of New Haven is the location of 68 of these properties and districts, including 9 National Historic Landmarks; they are listed here, while the other properties and districts in the remaining parts of the county, including 1 National Historic Landmark, are covered in National Register of Historic Places listings in New Haven County, Connecticut. Three sites appear in both New Haven County lists.

Current listings

|}

Former listings

|}

See also

List of National Historic Landmarks in Connecticut
National Register of Historic Places listings in Connecticut

References

 
New Haven